Peter Carson (3 October 1938 – 9 January 2013) was an English publisher, editor and translator of Russian literature. He was educated at Eton College and learnt Russian at home from his mother and during his National Service years at the Joint Services School for Linguists. He has translated two titles for Penguin Classics: several of Anton Chekhov's plays,  and Fathers and Sons by Ivan Turgenev.  The latter was praised by reviewers in the Times and the Times Literary Supplement. Donald Rayfield wrote in the Times Literary Supplement: "If you want to get as close as an English reader can to enjoying Turgenev, Carson is probably the best." He ironically completed a translation of The Death of Ivan Ilyich, a story of a dying man, and A Confession shortly before his death.

He was married to Eleo Gordon.

References

English translators
Linguists from the United Kingdom
1938 births
2013 deaths
People educated at Eton College
Russian–English translators
English publishers (people)
English male non-fiction writers
20th-century British translators
20th-century English male writers
20th-century English businesspeople